Oymapinar Dam is an arch dam built on the Manavgat river in Turkey in 1984. It is an arch dam in design, 185 m in height, built to generate hydroelectric power.

Oymapınar Dam is located 12 km north of Manavgat Waterfall. It is an artificial, freshwater dam with a capacity of 300 million cubic meters. 

Description
The dam has four underground turbines with a total capacity of 540 megawatts. When built in 1984 it was the third largest dam in Turkey. As more dams have been built, it is the fifth largest.

Because of the arch design, the force of water pushing against the dam compacts the dam and strengthens it. The weight of the dam structure pushes it down firmly into the underlying rock. This design is ideal for dams built in rocky narrow gorges.

Construction
The dam was designed in the USSR and built by Bilfinger Berger and completed in 1984.

Technical data 
Purpose - Energy
Embankment type - Concrete arch
Storage volume - 300 million m³
Crest length - 454 m
Spillway - 2,800 m³/s
Bottomoutlet - 350 m³/s
Power - 540 MW
Annual production - 1620 GWh/year

See also

Tilkiler Cave

Gallery

References

External links
About Side and Manavgat
Dam statistics
Dam Information
Dam Pics

Dams in Antalya Province
Arch dams
Hydroelectric power stations in Turkey
Dams completed in 1984
Dams on the Manavgat River